German submarine U-471 was a Type VIIC U-boat built for Nazi Germany's Kriegsmarine for service during World War II.
She was laid down on 25 October 1941 by Deutsche Werke, Kiel as yard number 302, launched on 6 March 1943 and commissioned on 5 May 1943 under Oberleutnant zur See Friedrich Kloevekorn.

Design
German Type VIIC submarines were preceded by the shorter Type VIIB submarines. U-471 had a displacement of  when at the surface and  while submerged. She had two shafts and two  propellers.

U-471 was fitted with five  torpedo tubes (four fitted at the bow and one at the stern), fourteen torpedoes, one  SK C/35 naval gun, 220 rounds, and one twin  C/30 anti-aircraft gun. The boat had a complement of between forty-four and sixty.

Service history
The boat's career began with training at 5th U-boat Flotilla on 5 May 1943, followed by active service on 1 November 1943 as part of the 1st Flotilla. On 1 May 1944, she transferred to 29th Flotilla for Mediterranean operations for the remainder of her service.
In 3 patrols she sank no ships.
In 1945, she was raised and returned to service with the French Navy as Millé from 1946. She was stricken on 9 July 1963 as Q339.

Wolfpacks
U-471 took part in six wolfpacks, namely:
 Coronel 1 (14 – 17 December 1943) 
 Sylt (18 – 23 December 1943) 
 Rügen 3 (26 – 28 December 1943) 
 Rügen 4 (28 December 1943 – 2 January 1944) 
 Rügen 3 (2 – 7 January 1944) 
 Rügen (7 – 22 January 1944)

Fate
U-471 was sunk on 6 August 1944 in the Military port of Toulon dry-dock in position , in an air raid by US Liberator bombers.

See also
 Mediterranean U-boat Campaign (World War II)

References

Bibliography

External links

German Type VIIC submarines
1943 ships
U-boats commissioned in 1943
U-boats sunk in 1944
U-boats sunk by US aircraft
World War II submarines of Germany
G
Ships built in Kiel
Maritime incidents in August 1944